Urolithin B (UB) is an urolithin, a type of phenolic compounds produced in the human gut after absorption of ellagitannins-containing food such as pomegranate, strawberries, red raspberries, walnuts or oak-aged red wine. Urolithin B is found in the urine in the form of urolithin B glucuronide.

See also 
 Glucuronide
 Glucuronic acid
 Pomegranate ellagitannins

References

External links 
 hmdb.ca

Coumarins
Benzochromenes
Phenolic human metabolites